Manzanera is a small town and municipality in the province of Teruel, part of the autonomous community of Aragón, Spain. It is in Gúdar-Javalambre comarca and it has 500 people. It is close to the ski area called Javalambre.

References

External links 

Web page about Manzanera

Municipalities in the Province of Teruel